libcaca is a software library that converts images into colored ASCII art. It includes the library itself, and several programs including cacaview, an image viewer that works inside a terminal emulator, and img2txt, which can convert an image to other text-based formats.

libcaca has been used in a variety of programs, including FFmpeg, VLC media player, and MPlayer.

libcaca is free software, licensed under Do What the Fuck You Want to Public License version 2.

Projects using libcaca 
 MPlayer 
 FFmpeg
 GStreamer
 VLC media player
 mpv
 Gnuplot
 ranger (file manager)

See also 
 AAlib
 ASCII art
 FFmpeg

References

External links 

 

ASCII art
Free multimedia software
Free software programmed in C
Software using the WTFPL license